Lucy Talbot (born 26 April 1989) is a New Zealand field hockey player. She has competed for the New Zealand women's national field hockey team (the Black Sticks Women) since 2009, including for the team at the 2010 Commonwealth Games.

In May 2012, Talbot broke her left hand at a training session in Napier, which required surgery to repair, and subsequently missed out on selection for the 2012 Summer Olympics.

Talbot was born in Auckland, and attended St Cuthbert's College.

References

1989 births
Living people
New Zealand female field hockey players
Field hockey players at the 2010 Commonwealth Games
Commonwealth Games silver medallists for New Zealand
People educated at St Cuthbert's College, Auckland
Commonwealth Games medallists in field hockey
Medallists at the 2010 Commonwealth Games